The 1990 Irish Greyhound Derby took place during August and September with the final being held at Shelbourne Park in Dublin on 15 September 1990.  

The winner The Other Toss won £30,000 and was trained by Matt O'Donnell, owned by John Houilhan and bred by Michael Lonergan. The race was sponsored by the Kerry Group's dog food product 'Respond'.

Final result 
At Shelbourne, 15 September (over 550 yards):

Distances 
1½, 1¾, 3, 2½, 1 (lengths)

Competition Report
The short lived points system used in the 1989 Irish Greyhound Derby had been scrapped to the relief of the Irish racing public. However, there was a repechage which was lucky for Phantom Flash because the Nick Savva trained black dog failed to progress in the qualifying round. The ante-post favourite with a huge reputation had a chance to make amends and did with an extremely fast 30.24 to progress; it was better than the best qualifying round time of 30.50 set by Ballybrack Charm.

In the first round Phantom Flash went even faster defeating kennelmate Westmead Harry by six lengths in 30.10 and Ger McKenna had a treble with Concentration, Itsallovernow and Bordout. Adraville Bridge second in the betting behind Phantom Flash failed to make the second round following a virus and he was a non-runner. 

Phantom Flash, The Other Toss and Maryville Kyle all impressed in round two and going into the semi-finals Phantom Flash was hot favourite to become the first ever British Bred winner of the classic. He scored an easy semi-final victory from Rosden Speedy and The Other Toss (who was 100-1 before the competition started) won again from Monaleen Stag. Finally Toss Pit scored a win ahead of Pets Echo to complete the final line up. 

In the final as the traps lifted Phantom Flash made a terrible start ending his hopes. Pets Echo and The Other Toss made great starts and the latter soon took the lead from Pets Echo and ran out an impressive winner. The unlucky Phantom Flash made good ground to finish third.

See also
1990 UK & Ireland Greyhound Racing Year

References

Greyhound Derby
Irish Greyhound Derby